Vyaznovatovka is a rural locality (a selo) and the administrative center of Vyaznovatovskoye Rural Settlement, Nizhnedevitsky District, Voronezh Oblast, Russia. The population was 1,016 as of 2018. There are 9 streets.

Geography 
Vyaznovatovka is located 15 km northeast of Nizhnedevitsk (the district's administrative centre) by road. Novaya Olshanka is the nearest rural locality.

References 

Rural localities in Nizhnedevitsky District